Memmingerberg is a municipality in the district of Unterallgäu in Bavaria, Germany. The town is seat of a municipal association with Benningen, Holzgünz, Lachen, Bavaria, Trunkelsberg and Ungerhausen.

References

Unterallgäu